Naeemuddin (born 17 June 1981) is a Pakistani first-class cricketer who played for Sialkot. He appeared in more than 90 first-class matches from 2007 to 2018.

References

External links
 

1981 births
Living people
Pakistani cricketers
Sialkot cricketers
Sui Northern Gas Pipelines Limited cricketers
Cricketers from Gujranwala
Cricketers at the 2010 Asian Games
Asian Games medalists in cricket
Asian Games bronze medalists for Pakistan
Medalists at the 2010 Asian Games
Sialkot Stallions cricketers